Mike Rhodes (born January 22, 1966) is a former American football quarterback who played four seasons in the Arena Football League with the Denver Dynamite, Washington Commandos, Albany Firebirds and Miami Hooters. He played college football at the Georgia Institute of Technology. He was also a member of the London Monarchs of the World League of American Football.

References

External links
Just Sports Stats
College stats

1966 births
Living people
People from Smyrna, Georgia
Sportspeople from Cobb County, Georgia
Players of American football from Georgia (U.S. state)
American football quarterbacks
Georgia Tech Yellow Jackets football players
Denver Dynamite (arena football) players
Washington Commandos players
London Monarchs players
Albany Firebirds players
Miami Hooters players